Bill Morris (28 May 1917 – 2 March 2004) was an English cricketer. He played for Essex between 1946 and 1950 and Cambridgeshire in the Minor Counties Championship between 1951 and 1958.

References

External links

1917 births
2004 deaths
English cricketers
Essex cricketers
Cricketers from Kingston, Jamaica
Cambridgeshire cricketers